The 2019 United States Men's Curling Championship was held from February 9 to 16 at the Wings Event Center in Kalamazoo, Michigan. It was held in conjunction with the 2019 United States Women's Curling Championship.

Teams 
Ten teams qualified to participate in the 2019 national championship.

Round-robin standings  
Final round-robin standings

Round-robin results 
All draw times are listed in Eastern Standard Time (UTC−7)

Draw 1 
Saturday, February 9, 7:00pm

Draw 2 
Sunday, February 10, 8:00am

Draw 3 
Sunday, February 10, 4:00pm

Draw 4 
Monday, February 11, 9:00am

Draw 5 
Monday, February 11, 7:00pm

Draw 6 
Monday, February 12, 2:00pm

Draw 7 
Monday, February 13, 9:00am

Draw 8 
Monday, February 13, 7:00pm

Draw 9 
Monday, February 14, 4:00pm

Playoffs

1 vs. 2 
Friday, February 15, 1:00pm ET

3 vs. 4 
Friday, February 15, 1:00pm ET

Semifinal 
Friday, February 15, 7:00pm ET

Final  
Saturday, February 16, 3:00 pm ET

References

External links 

 

United States National Curling Championships
Curling in Michigan
Sports in Kalamazoo, Michigan
United States Men's
Curling, United States Men's
Curling, United States Men's